Black Crow may refer to:

 Black crow, a species of birds of the genus Corvus
 Black crow, alternate name of the Cape crow (Corvus capensis)
 Black Crow (automobile), an automobile manufactured from 1909 to 1911 by the Crow Motor Car Company
 Black Crow (comics), a fictional Native American superhero published by Marvel Comics
 Selo Black Crow (1932–2004), Native American leader, rodeo rider, paratrooper
 "Black Crow", a Joni Mitchell song from the 1976 album Hejira
 "Black Crow", a Shonen Knife song from the 2014 album  Overdrive
 "Black Crow", a song by Amy Odell
 "Black Crow", a 2010 single by Angus & Julia Stone
 Pave Mace/Black Crow, a magnetic anomaly detector used by the Lockheed AC-130A during the Vietnam War

See also
The Black Crowes, an American band